Thame  is a market town and civil parish in Oxfordshire, about  east of the city of Oxford and  southwest of Aylesbury. It derives its name from the River Thame which flows along the north side of the town and forms part of the county border with Buckinghamshire. The parish includes the hamlet of Moreton south of the town. The 2011 Census recorded the parish's population as 11,561.  Thame was founded in the Anglo-Saxon era and was in the kingdom of Wessex.

Abbey, parish church and prebendal

Thame Abbey was founded in 1138 for the Cistercian Order: the abbey church was consecrated in 1145. In the 16th century Dissolution of the Monasteries the abbey was suppressed and the church demolished. Thame Park (the house) was built on the site, incorporating parts of the abbey including the early-16th century abbot's house. Its interior is one of the earliest examples of the Italian Renaissance in England. A Georgian west wing was added in the 18th century.

The earliest feature of the Church of England parish church of Mary the Virgin is the 12th century base of the font. The font's octagonal bowl was re-cut in the 13th century. The present church is a cruciform building that was built in the 13th century. The chancel is Early English Gothic and was built in about 1220, with six lancet windows in its north wall and presumably a similar arrangement in the south wall. It was twice altered in the next few decades: a three-light plate tracery window was inserted in its north wall in the mid-13th century and the five-light east window with geometrical tracery was inserted in about 1280. Whatever lancet windows may have been in the chancel south wall were replaced with three two-light Decorated Gothic windows with reticulated tracery, and a double piscina was added at the same time.

The transepts and tower arches are also early 13th century. The nave has five-bay north and south aisles whose arcades were built in about 1260. The aisles were widened in the 14th century, when they acquired their Decorated Gothic windows and doors. The Decorated Gothic south porch has two storeys and a two-bay quadripartite vault.

The Perpendicular Gothic clerestory is 14th or early 15th century. In the 15th century the tower piers were strengthened and the two upper stages of the tower were built. In 1442 the north transept was rebuilt with five-light Perpendicular Gothic north and east windows with panel tracery. At about the same time the south transept acquired similar windows and was extended eastwards to form a chapel with a 15th-century piscina. The Perpendicular Gothic nave west window was inserted in 1672–73, making it an example of Gothic survival. In 1838 the north aisle north wall was rebuilt under the direction of George Wilkinson.  The tower has a ring of eight bells, all cast by Mears and Stainbank of the Whitechapel Bell Foundry in 1876.

The Prebendal House is known to have existed by 1234, The Early English Gothic chapel was built in about 1250. The solar is also 13th century but was enlarged in the 14th, when the present crown-post roof was added. The rest of the Prebendal House is dated from the 15th century. The hall is 14th century in plan but was later divided, and one part now has a fine 15th century roof. In 1661 the antiquary Anthony Wood reported that the house was ruinous, and early in the 19th century the remains were in use as a farmhouse and barns. It was restored in 1836. The Prebendal House was the home of singer/songwriter Robin Gibb and his wife Dwina from 1984, and Gibb is buried in St Mary's parish churchyard.

Social and economic history

In 1550 the courtier John Williams, 1st Baron Williams of Thame built the almshouses in Church Lane. He died in 1559, and his will established the local grammar school. Its original building, completed in 1569, stands next to the almshouses. In 1880 the school moved to its current premises in Oxford Road. In 1971 it became a comprehensive school under the name Lord Williams's School.

The Civil War in the 1640s saw Thame occupied in turn by Royalists and by Parliamentarians. After the Battle of Chalgrove Field in 1643, Colonel John Hampden, who had been educated at the grammar school, died of his wounds at the house of Ezekiel Browne, later to become the Greyhound Inn.

The champion bare-knuckle boxer James Figg was born in Thame in the late 17th century and had his early prize-fights at the Greyhound Inn. In the 21st century the Greyhound Inn was renamed the James Figg and in April 2011 the Oxfordshire Blue Plaques Board unveiled a blue plaque there to commemorate him.

In the 18th century many of the buildings in the boat-shaped High Street were re-faced with modern facades built of locally produced salt glazed bricks. Late in the 18th century John Wesley preached in Thame. The congregation on that occasion was so large that the floor of the building gave way, and the crowd fell to the lower floor.

By 1813 Thame had a workhouse in Wellington Street. In 1826 John Boddington, a miller who had been the proprietor of Thame Mill, became master of the workhouse. In 1831 his son, also John Boddington, became a clerk at Strangeways Brewery in Manchester. A younger son, Henry Boddington, who had been born at Thame Mill in 1813, followed his brother and joined the same brewery in 1832. Henry became a partner in the business in 1847 and sole proprietor in 1853, after which its beers were called Boddingtons. In April 2011 the Oxfordshire Blue Plaques Board unveiled a blue plaque at the address of the former workhouse commemorating its association with Henry Boddington.

Thame Poor Law Union was established in 1835 and the following year a new workhouse designed by George Wilkinson was built on Oxford Road. In the 20th century the building became the premises of Rycotewood College of further education. In 2003 with two other colleges of further education to form Oxford and Cherwell College, now City of Oxford College.

The extension was completed in 1864 when it reached .

Thame Town Hall was designed by the architect HJ Tollit in Jacobethan style and built in 1888.

In 1940 Willocks McKenzie, a local lorry driver, found a small hoard of late Medieval coins and rings beside the River Thame. The coins were ten groats and the rings were five ornate examples ranging from the 14th to the 16th centuries. The county Coroner declared them to be treasure trove and therefore Crown property. The Crown placed the hoard on permanent loan to the Ashmolean Museum. The most ornate ring was an ecclesiastical one incorporating a small reliquary. Its lid is decorated with a distinctive cross with two horizontal sections, similar to the Cross of Lorraine. Thame Town Council incorporated this cross into its town emblem.

In 1974 the M40 motorway was extended from High Wycombe to Chilworth Farm at Great Milton. In 1990 the M40 extension was completed, giving Thame a fast road link to Birmingham.

The station has a large car park, a taxi office, and regular buses into Thame.

In 1991 Thame oil depot closed, and BR dismantled the railway between Thame and Princes Risborough. Sustrans was allowed to re-use the former trackbed to create the Phoenix Trail which is part of National Cycle Network route 57. Reopening the rail line through Thame was an option considered by Chiltern Railways in their plan to open a direct rail route from London Marylebone to Oxford via Princes Risborough in 2015. The cost of reinstating bridges was considered prohibitive.

Bentley Productions used Thame many times as a location for the Midsomer Murders drama series, representing the fictional town of Causton.

Economy
The town's two largest employers, CPM Group and Travelodge, both have their head offices on the edge of the town. W. Lucy & Co. moved its base from Oxford to Thame in 2005.

Public transport
See above for details of Haddenham and Thame Parkway station. As of 2013 the fastest London Marylebone trains took 36 minutes.  Arriva the Shires Sapphire bus routes 280 and X8 link Oxford railway station and Aylesbury via Thame. Route 280 runs daily and serves Wheatley and Haddenham. It runs every 20 minutes from Mondays to Saturdays and every 30 minutes on Sundays. Route X8 is an express service that bypasses Wheatley and Haddenham, used to run hourly on a Monday to Friday. From February 2019, the X8 only has 6 buses a day. 2 in the morning peak running from Aylesbury to Oxford and 4 in the evening peak running from Oxford to Aylesbury.

Carousel Buses route 40 links Thame with High Wycombe via Chinnor and Stokenchurch. Services run hourly from Mondays to Saturdays. There is no Sunday or bank holiday service.  In July 2016 Oxfordshire County Council ceased all bus subsidies. Buckinghamshire County Council still contracts operators to run subsidised bus routes, a few of which link local villages to Thame. They include route 110 operated by Redline Buses and routes 111, 112 and 113 run by Z&S Transport.

Amenities

Thame has three primary schools: Barley Hill Primary School, John Hampden Primary School and St Joseph's Catholic Primary School. It has one county secondary school, Lord Williams's School.  Both the Army Cadets and the Air Training Corps have units in the town. 594 (Thame) Air Training Corps was formed in 1994, originally as a detached flight of 966 (Wallingford) Squadron. It became an independent unit in 1997, taking the number 594 Squadron.

Sport
Chinnor Rugby Club is based at Thame. Its first XV currently plays in National Division One. The course was designed by Rees Jones and has hosted tournaments including the Benson & Hedges International Open from 1996 until 1999. Thame Leisure Centre, located on Oxford Road, has a 25-metre swimming pool, dance studio, gym and racquet sports facilities.

Twinning
Thame is twinned with Montesson in France and Sinaia in Romania.

Notable residents
Violinist Alfredo Campoli (1906–91) was married at St Joseph's Catholic Church in 1942 and retired to Thame in 1986. In April 2011 the Oxfordshire Blue Plaques Board unveiled a blue plaque at 39 North Street to commemorate him.

The Slow Mo Guys, English film-maker and Internet personality Gavin Free (born 1988) and his co-host Daniel Gruchy (born 1988), lived in the town from 1992 until 2012. Free now lives in Austin, Texas.

Robin Gibb of the Bee Gees and his wife Dwina Murphy-Gibb lived in Prebendal House in Thame until his death in 2012. Robin's younger brother, Andy Gibb, also lived with Robin in Prebendal House in Thame in the weeks before his death in 1988.

BBC actor, announcer, executive Harman Grisewood (1908–97) was brought up at the Prebendal House in the 1910s and 1920s. It had a resident Catholic priest, Father Randolph Traill, who served in its chapel. In his autobiography, One Thing at a Time (1968), he described an outing with his brother, nanny, nursemaid and pram, when they were stoned by villagers as they approached the Church of England parish church.

Poet and playwright W. B. Yeats (1865–1939) lived in the town for a short time at Cuttle Brook House, 42 Lower High Street. His son was born there in 1921. A blue plaque commemorating him was unveiled in 2011.

The composer Howard Goodall lived in Thame in the 1960s and 70s and, after leaving Stowe School, attended Lord Williams's School.

Jonathan More and Matt Black, the duo who make up Coldcut both lived in Thame and attended LWS.

Ronald Lee, cricketer.

Fiona Bruce, television presenter.

See also
 Thame Museum

References

Sources and further reading

External links

Thame Town Council

 
Civil parishes in Oxfordshire
Market towns in Oxfordshire
South Oxfordshire District